Pascal Pierre (born 28 May 1968) is a French former professional footballer who played as a defender. While at Metz he played in the final as they won the 1995–96 Coupe de la Ligue.

References

External links

1968 births
Living people
French footballers
Footballers from Caen
Association football defenders
Ligue 1 players
Ligue 2 players
Stade Brestois 29 players
FC Metz players